Cham Dogham (also Romanized as Cham Dagham and Cham-e Dagham) is a village in Anaqcheh Rural District, in the Central District of Ahvaz County, Khuzestan Province, Iran. At the 2006 census, its population was 73, in 14 families.

References 

Populated places in Ahvaz County